This article documents the 2009–10 season of Lancashire football club Accrington Stanley. It was the team's 4th season in League Two after winning promotion from the Conference National in 2005–06.

Shareholder Ilyas Khan withdrew financial support in early October, and the debt ridden club struggled with early season form. With debts mounting, fans came to the aid of Stanley through the 'Save our Stanley' campaign. The club was forced to clear £308,000 worth of tax debt, and the club's target was reached on 3 November 2009.

After winning 7 from 8 games in League Two during midseason, Stanley found themselves challenging for a playoff spot, and reaching the 2009–10 Football League Trophy north semi-final was also a highlight. Stanley were winless from 9 games late in the season, but held 15th spot with 2 wins and a draw in the last 3 games of the season.

Players

Current squad
As of 12 March 2010.

Out on loan

Pre-season

League Two

Table

Results

League Cup

Football League Trophy

FA Cup

References

External links 

Accrington Stanley F.C. seasons
Accrington Stanley